Lake Rajucocha (possibly from Quechua rahu snow, ice, mountain with snow, qucha lake) is a lake in Peru located at a height of about  in the Ancash Region, Huaylas Province, Santa Cruz District. The lake is 1.1 km long, 0.58 km wide, and has an area of 0.54 km2. Lake Rajucocha lies in the Cordillera Blanca, west of Santa Cruz Norte.

References 

Rajucocha
Rajucocha